Kang Shih-ju (born 16 January 1964) is a Taiwanese politician.

Political career
Kang chose to run as an independent in the January 2008 legislative elections, after losing the Kuomintang nomination to Lee Yi-ting. After Lee was charged with electoral fraud, Kang defeated Lee's wife in an by-election held on 14 March 2009. He took office on 1 April, and joined the Non-Partisan Solidarity Union's legislative caucus. He ran for reelection in 2016, as a member of the Minkuotang, and lost.

References

1964 births
Living people
Members of the 7th Legislative Yuan
Kuomintang politicians in Taiwan
Miaoli County Members of the Legislative Yuan
Minkuotang politicians